The 2015–16 Primera Divisió or Lliga Grup Becier, was the 21st season of top-tier football in Andorra. The season began on 27 September 2015. The defending champions were FC Santa Coloma, who won their ninth championship in the previous season.

Teams

Clubs and locations

Personnel and sponsorship

Competition format
The participating teams first play a conventional round-robin schedule with every team playing each opponent once "home" and once "away" for a total of 14 games. The league is then split up in two groups of four teams with each of them playing teams within its group in a home-and-away cycle of games. The top four teams compete for the championship. The bottom four clubs play for one direct relegation spot and one relegation play-off spot. Records earned in the First Round are taken over to the respective Second Round.

Promotion and relegation from 2014–15
Inter Club d'Escaldes were relegated after last season due to finishing in eighth place. They were replaced by Segona Divisió champions Penya Encarnada d'Andorra.

UE Engordany, who finished last season in 7th place, and Segona Divisió runners up Atlètic Club d'Escaldes played a two-legged relegation play-off. UE Engordany won the playoff, 4–2 on aggregate, and remained in the Primera Divisió while Atlètic Club d'Escaldes remained in the Segona Divisió.

Regular season

Championship and relegation round
Records earned in the regular season are taken over to the Championship round and relegation round.

Championship round

Relegation round

Primera Divisió play-offs
The seventh-placed team (third-placed in the relegation round), Encamp, were originally set to compete in a two-legged relegation play-off against CE Carroi, the runner-up of the 2015–16 Segona Divisió for one spot in 2016–17 Primera Divisió.

However, on 20 May 2016, it was announced that Encamp were awarded the tie against CE Carroi, therefore Encamp will remain in the top flight for next season.

References

External links
  
Visualització de Partits - Andorran football league tables, records & statistics database. 
uefa.com

Primera Divisió seasons
Andorra
1